Palanisamy is a common Indian name.

Politicians 
K. N. Palanisamy Gounder, former TiruppurMLA
G. Palanisamy, former Thiruthuraipundi MLA
Edappadi K. Palaniswami, Ex-Chief Minister of Tamil Nadu & Edapadi MLA
K. C. Palanisamy, former Indian Member of Parliament from Karur
N. K. Palanisamy, former Perundurai MLA
Pongalur N. Palanisamy, Tamil Nadu minister for Rural Industries and Animal Husbandry.
S. Palanisamy, former Mettupalayam MLA